Kamwatta Hill is a community in the Barima-Waini Region, in northern Guyana. Kamwatta is an Amerindian village inhabited by Warao and Arawak people.

Kamwatta Hill is located at an altitude of 34 m (114 feet). Its population as of 2012 is 565 inhabitants. The economy is based on subsistence farming. Kamwatta Hill has a health centre and a primary school, however secondary education is provided in Wauna or Hosororo.  The community began receiving electricity in 2006, when a diesel-powered generator was donated by Mr. Monty Niathally, proprietor of Variety Woods and Greenheart Limited.

References

Bibliography

Populated places in Barima-Waini
Indigenous villages in Guyana